Rehimena infundibulalis is a moth in the family Crambidae. It is found in Indonesia (Sumatra), Fiji and Australia, where it has been recorded from Queensland.

References

Moths described in 1880
Spilomelinae